Ashley Kidd (born November 15, 1994) is a professional wakesurfer and three-time world champion.

Kidd was raised in Corpus Christi, Texas and took up the sport in 2009 on the encouragement of her older brother. In 2010, she won 2nd place in the World Wake Surf Championship where she was entered in the amateur women's group and that same year began competing as a professional. She went on to win the first place in the 2014, 2015 and 2016 World Wake Surf Championships in the women's professional group. As of July 2016 she was ranked Number 1 in the women's professional division of the Competitive Wake Surf Association world rankings.

References

External links

AK Surfboards
Cicoria, Michele (28 December 2014). "Ashley Kidd campionessa mondiale wakesurfing". 4ActionSport (videos and photographs, text in Italian)

1994 births
Living people
Sportspeople from Corpus Christi, Texas
American female surfers
American wakeboarders
21st-century American women